The Chevrolet Spin is a mini MPV produced by General Motors under the Chevrolet marque. Developed by GM do Brasil, the vehicle replaced the Meriva and Zafira in South America with an option of two-row and three-row seating. It is produced in Brazil since 2012 and has been exported throughout the South American region. Between 2013 and 2015, GM Indonesia assembled the vehicle for the Southeast Asian market at its Bekasi plant.

Overview 

The Spin was mainly designed and engineered in Brazil by GM Brasil Centro Tecnológico São Caetano do Sul. During development, it was known as the PM5/PM7 project. The vehicle is developed to replace both the Chevrolet Meriva and Chevrolet Zafira in South America which was developed by Opel. It is built on the same platform as the Brazilian Chevrolet Cobalt.

Developed with a goal of a large cabin space, the vehicle is built on a -long wheelbase which is shared with the Cobalt. For three-row models, the seats are arranged in a "theatre" format in which the rear seats are positioned higher than the front seats, allowing for better visibility for rear passengers. With all seats in place, the luggage capacity of the three-row Spin is 162 L, and with the third row seat folded it has 553 L of space. Two-row models have 710 L of cargo space. A total of 23 seat arrangements are possible.

The Spin has been produced since 2012 at the General Motors do Brasil plant in São Caetano do Sul, Brazil. It was also produced in Indonesia between 2013 and 2015 at the GM Indonesia plant in Bekasi, West Java. Production in Indonesia had started in February 2013. In late June 2015, GM ended the production of the Spin in Indonesia and shut down the Bekasi plant due to low demand and high manufacturing costs.

Markets

Brazil 

The Spin was revealed in June 2012 for the Brazilian market. Offered in LT and LTZ trims, the LTZ trim offered an optional third-row seating to serve as the replacement to the Zafira. Transmission options include a 5-speed manual and 6-speed GF6 automatic from the Cruze. GM targeted a monthly sales of 2,800 units for the market.

In November 2014, the Brazilian market received the crossover-inspired Activ trim.

A revised version was released in March 2015 for the 2016 model year, which gained revised interior colour scheme and an updated automatic transmission.

Argentina 
The Spin was released in Argentina in March 2013. Produced in Brazil, the Spin in Argentina is available in LT, LTZ and Activ trim levels. Engine options available are the EconoFlex 1.8-litre petrol engine along with the Fiat-sourced 1.3-litre Multijet turbodiesel engine. The diesel engine was only available for the LTZ trim for both five-seater and seven-seater models.

Indonesia 
The Spin was introduced in Indonesia in February 2013. The Indonesian version was locally assembled, offering a standard three-row seating and third row ventilation in all models.

Three trim levels and three engine options were offered at launch. The base engine is a 1.2-litre A12XER petrol engine sourced from Opel which was available for the LS and LT trims, with a 5-speed manual transmission. The 1.5-litre petrol engine was offered for all trims and was available with 5-speed manual and 6-speed automatic. A 1.3-litre Multijet turbodiesel engine sourced from Fiat and branded as TDCi was also available.

In April 2014, GM Indonesia introduced the Activ trim level which was only available with the 1.5-litre engine with automatic transmission. It is similar to the Brazilian-market Spin Activ sans the rear-mounted external spare tyre. The trim also gained steering audio controls, along with black-coloured seats.

Production ended in July 2015, with remaining inventory sold out by May 2016.

Thailand 
The Spin was introduced in Thailand in April 2013. Imported from Indonesia, it was offered in a sole LTZ trim with the 1.5-litre engine and automatic transmission.

Philippines 
The Spin was unveiled in the Philippines in July 2013 and went on sale the following month. It was introduced with three trim levels, which are 1.3-litre Turbo Diesel, 1.3-litre Turbo Diesel LTZ and 1.5-litre LTZ petrol. It was sourced from the Indonesian plant.

Facelift 

The facelifted Spin was launched in June 2018 in Argentina and in July 2018 for the Brazilian market. The new Spin received a restyled front fascia and rear fascia, along with a revised dashboard and the removal of digital instrument cluster. Several new safety features were introduced such as three-point seatbelt, headrest for the central second row passenger and ISOFIX. According to GM, improvements were made in the calibration of the automatic gearbox to optimize gear changes, allowing for quicker acceleration. Trim levels available in Brazil are LS, LT, LTZ, and Activ7.

For the 2020 model year, the LTZ trim was renamed to Premier. The 2021 model year gained standard stability control and hill start assist, front seatbelt warning, a revised instrument cluster design, and a new automatic gearbox.

Sales

References

External links 

 

Spin
Mini MPVs
Front-wheel-drive vehicles
Cars introduced in 2012
2010s cars
2020s cars